Valenzuela despaxi is a species of Psocoptera from Caeciliusidae family that can be found in Austria, Belgium, Bulgaria, Finland, France, Germany, Hungary, Luxembourg, Norway, Poland, Spain, Sweden, and Switzerland.

References

Caeciliusidae
Insects described in 1936
Psocoptera of Europe